Liga Nacional Argentina A-1 is the biggest Roller Hockey Clubs Championship in Argentina, and in the Americas.

Current teams (2010–11 season)

Zona A

Zona B

List of Winners

League Champions

Titles by Team

Titles by State

External links

Argentina websites
Liga Nacional Official Website
Cofederation Argentina de Patin
Diario de Cuyo
Bochin Stick
Canal 4 San Juan

International
 Roller Hockey links worldwide
 Mundook-World Roller Hockey
Hardballhock-World Roller Hockey
Inforoller World Roller Hockey
 World Roller Hockey Blog
rinkhockey-news - World Roller Hockey

Recurring sporting events established in 1994
Roll
Roller hockey in Argentina
Argentina